Zoviyeh-ye Yek-e Olya (also Romanized as Zovīyeh-ye Yek-e ‘Olyā; also known as Zoveyeh Yek, Zovīyeh-ye Bālā, Zovīyeh Yek, Zovīyeh-ye ‘Olyā, Zovīyeh-ye Yek, and Zovīyek Yek) is a village in Shoaybiyeh-ye Sharqi Rural District, Shadravan District, Shushtar County, Khuzestan Province, Iran. At the 2006 census, its population was 465, in 89 families.

References 

Populated places in Shushtar County